Serhat Kot (born 12 August 1997) is a Turkish professional footballer who plays as a midfielder for Turgutluspor.

Professional career
A youth product of Borussia Dortmund, Kot begun his senior career with the Turkish club Altay S.K., before moving back to Germany with 1. FC Nürnberg II. He joined Fenerbahçe in the summer of 2017, joining their youth side. Kot made his professional debut with Fenerbahçe in a 2-0 Süper Lig win over İstanbul Başakşehir F.K. on 11 February 2018.

On 24 August 2019, Kot signed a one-year contract with Dutch club MVV Maastricht competing in the second-tier Eerste Divisie. He left the club when his contract expired in July 2020.

International career
Kot represented the Turkey U16s at the 2013 Montaigu Tournament.

References

External links
 
 
 
 
 
 FuPa Profile
 DFB Profile

1997 births
German people of Turkish descent
Sportspeople from Bielefeld
Footballers from North Rhine-Westphalia
Living people
German footballers
Turkish footballers
Turkey youth international footballers
Association football midfielders
Altay S.K. footballers
1. FC Nürnberg II players
Fenerbahçe S.K. footballers
MVV Maastricht players
1922 Konyaspor footballers
Turgutluspor footballers
TFF Third League players
Regionalliga players
Süper Lig players
Eerste Divisie players
TFF Second League players
Turkish expatriate footballers
Expatriate footballers in the Netherlands
Turkish expatriate sportspeople in the Netherlands